Alpine is a city on the northeastern edge of Utah County, Utah, United States. The population was 10,251 at the time of the 2020 census. Alpine has been one of the many quickly-growing cities of Utah since the 1970s, especially in the 1990s. This city is thirty-two miles southeast of Salt Lake City. It is located on the slopes of the Wasatch Range north of Highland and American Fork. The west side of the city runs above the Wasatch Fault.

History
The area, which would one day become Alpine, was settled by William Wordsworth and several other homesteading families in the fall of 1850. The town was originally called Mountainville, and under the latter name settlement was first made in 1851. The city was renamed because the views from the elevated town site were compared to the Swiss Alps.

Geography
Alpine is located on State Route 74, just north of the city of Highland.

None of that area is covered with water, although several small mountain streams run through the city for years with sufficient rainfall.

There are several mountain biking trails around the city that attract bikers from all over the state. There are also many trails and paths well suited for back-trail hiking along the mountains. The nearby American Fork Canyon offers camping, swimming, and access to mountaineering regions around Mount Timpanogos.

The hills surrounding Alpine have been affected by several brush fires in recent years, the most devastating of which was the Quail Fire, which consumed over 2200 acres on the north-east side of town in July 2012. The area is serviced by the Lone Peak Fire Department and Lone Peak Police Force.

Climate

Demographics

Alpine is part of the Provo–Orem metropolitan area.

As of the 2020 United States Census, there were 10,251 people, 1,662 households, and 1,545 families residing in the city. The population density was 1,319.67 people per square mile (383.2/km). There were 2,804 housing units at an average density of 240.7 per square mile (93.0/km). The racial makeup of the city was 96.40% White, 0.1% African American, 0.4% Native American, 0.5% Asian, 0.0% Pacific Islander, 2% from other races, and 1.41% from two or more races. Hispanic or Latino of any race were 1.60% of the population.

There were 1,662 households, out of which 63.7% had children under the age of 18 living with them, 86.5% were married couples living together, 4.9% had a female householder with no husband present, and 7.0% were non-families. 6.3% of all households were made up of individuals, and 3.1% had someone living alone who was 65 years or older. The average household size was 4.30, and the average family size was 4.51.

In the city, the population was spread out, with 34.9% under 18, 9.4% from 18 to 24, 23.3% from 25 to 44, 17.0% from 45 to 64, and 11.6% who were 65 years of age or older. The median age was 21 years. For every 100 females, there were 101.3 males. For every 100 females aged 18 and over, there were 99.7 males.

The median income for a household in the city was $129,239, and the median income for a family was $74,891. Males had a median income of $57,250 versus $33,571 for females. The per capita income was $45,352. About 3.5% of families and 3.6% of the population were below the poverty line, including 3.1% of those under age 18 and 9.1% of those aged 65 or over.

Government
The mayor of Alpine is Carla Merrill. The members of the City Council are Jessica Smuin, Lon Lott, Kelli Law, Jason Thelin, and Greg Gordon. Alpine City Hall, located at the intersection of Main St. and Center St, celebrated the 80th anniversary of its construction in 2016.

Alpine is part of Utah's 3rd congressional district, represented by Republican John Curtis.

Education
Despite being a fairly small town, Alpine is home to five schools. Three of the schools are a part of the Alpine School District, while the fourth, Mountainville Academy, is a charter school for grades K-9. Alpine Elementary and Westfield Elementary are Alpine District Schools for grades K-6. The Alpine District elementary schools feed into Timberline Middle School, a 7–9 grade school. The Montessori Canyon Academy was founded by Michelle Kerr in 2014 and offers private preschool education.

Points of interest 

 Burgess Park
 Creekside Park (100 South Park)
 Historic Moyle Park
 Horsetail Falls (Dry Creek Trail)
 Petersen Arboretum
 Sliding Rock
 American Fork Canyon (Alpine Scenic Highway)
 Tibble Fork Reservoir and Silver Lake Flat

Notable people 

 William Grant Bangerter, religious authority
 Julie B. Beck, president of Relief Society 2007-12
 Jason Chaffetz, former congressman
 Frank Jackson, Duke and NBA basketball player
 Mike Kennedy, state representative and 2018 Utah senate candidate
 Rick Koerber, convicted fraudster
 Mike Lee, U.S. senator
 Bronco Mendenhall, Virginia Cavaliers football coach
 Dale Murphy, former MLB player
 Lloyd Newell, speaker for the Mormon Tabernacle Choir
 Orrin Olsen, BYU and NFL football player
 May Booth Talmage, Relief Society overseer
 Celestia Taylor, BYU professor
 The 5 Browns, classical music group
 Josh James, founder of Domo and the former Omniture
 Lee Johnson, former NFL player

See also

List of cities and towns in Utah

References

External links

 

 
Provo–Orem metropolitan area
Populated places established in 1850
Cities in Utah
Cities in Utah County, Utah